Mahdi Ahmed al-Hafez was Minister of Planning in the cabinet appointed by the Interim Iraq Governing Council in September 2003 and in the Iraqi Interim Government. A Shia Muslim, al-Hafez was the Iraqi representative to the United Nations from 1978 to 1980; afterwards, he headed the Arab Economic Research Association in Cairo. He is associated with the Iraqi Independent Democrats.

He was elected to the Iraqi Council of Representatives in the Iraqi legislative election of December 2005 as part of the secular Iraqi National List. In May 2007 he announced he was withdrawing from the list to sit as an independent. He died on October 2, 2017.

References

Members of the Council of Representatives of Iraq
Government ministers of Iraq
Permanent Representatives of Iraq to the United Nations
2017 deaths
1943 births
Charles University alumni
Iraqi economists